Hemiptocha agraphella is a moth in the family Crambidae. It was described by Paul Dognin in 1905. It is found in Argentina.

References

Chiloini
Moths described in 1905